Amnaay Zebedayo Bayo (born 20 May 1976 in Arusha) is a Tanzanian long-distance runner who specializes in the marathon.

He won the City-Pier-City Loop half marathon in the Hague in 2000.

Achievements

Personal bests
10,000 metres - 28:21.60 min (2000)
Half marathon - 1:00:50 hrs (2000)
Marathon - 2:08:51 hrs (1998)

References

External links
marathoninfo

1976 births
Living people
Tanzanian male marathon runners
Athletes (track and field) at the 2000 Summer Olympics
Athletes (track and field) at the 2004 Summer Olympics
Olympic athletes of Tanzania